Racławiczki , (German: Rasselwitz; 1939–1945 Roßtal O. S) is a village in the administrative district of Gmina Strzeleczki, within Krapkowice County, Opole Voivodeship, in south-western Poland.

The village has an approximate population of 876.

References

Villages in Krapkowice County